Góra Szwedów Lighthouse is a deactivated lighthouse on the coast of the Baltic Sea in the administrative region of the town of Hel, Puck County, Pomeranian Voivodeship, in Poland. The lighthouse is located on the Hel Peninsula, on Góra Szwedów, a  hill. The lighthouse is located between the Jastarnia Lighthouse and the Hel Lighthouse. The lighthouse replaced the Jastarnia Bór Lighthouse. The lighthouse was deactivated in 1990.

See also 

 List of lighthouses in Poland

References

External links 
 Urząd Morski w Słupsku  

Lighthouses completed in 1936
Resort architecture in Pomerania
Lighthouses in Poland
Tourist attractions in Pomeranian Voivodeship